Warren Hayward (born 15 May 1984) is a South African cricketer. He played in ten first-class and seven List A matches for Boland from 2005 to 2008.

See also
 List of Boland representative cricketers

References

External links
 

1984 births
Living people
South African cricketers
Boland cricketers
Cricketers from Johannesburg